Giovanni Esposito may refer to:
 Giovanni Esposito (comedian)
 Giovanni Esposito (general)
 Giovanni Esposito (judoka)
 Giani Esposito, also known as Giovanni, French actor and singer-songwriter